Snapline is a band based in Beijing, consisting of Li Qing on guitar and keyboards and Li Weisi on bass, who met while at students the Beijing Institute of Technology. Their music was dedicated to working out in a contemporary Beijing context the sounds and ideas produced by the noise and minimalist musicians of the 1970s and 1980s, especially focusing on the New York scene of that period. Wanting also explore the dark, industrial music coming out of England during that period, especially from bands like Joy Division and the Cure, the two created a side project, which performed strange, drum-machine-driven music over dark, minor chords.  Chen Xi, on vocals and drum machine, brought a softer sound to the band with his singing.

Ex-Public Image Ltd drummer Martin Atkins produced their first CD.

Irrespective 

As snippets of the recording filtered through the scene in China, the band's shows started drawing larger crowds, and they soon began to develop a strong following.  A series of concerts at D-22 established them as one of the central bands in the scene, much loved by critics and musicians, although difficult at times for audiences to follow. In October, 2007, the performed a set at the Modern Sky festival.  After that show it was clear to many that Snapline was one of the key bands in the musical explosion emanating from Beijing.

Press

The subject of many articles in the Chinese press, the band was listed in the September 2007 edition of That's Beijing as one of the ten best bands in China and in an article in Rolling Stone that same year Li Qing was listed as one of China's four major guitar innovators.

Discography

References

External links
 Snapline Interview: SXSW 2010
 Snapline + Party Is Over, Pornostar CD Reviewed on Crocksimplication
 Snap, Crackle and Pop: Snapline frontman Chen Xi talks about the band’s upcoming album
 Review: Snapline at Mao Livehouse
 A Crop Of New Rock Bands Changing the Face of Chinese Youth Culture

Musical groups from Beijing
People's Republic of China musicians